Third party is a term used in the United States for American political parties other than the two dominant parties, currently the Republican and Democratic parties.  Sometimes the phrase "minor party" is used instead of third party.

Third parties are most often encountered in presidential nominations. No third-party candidate has won the presidency since the Republican Party became a major party in the mid-19th century. Since that time, only in five elections (1892, 1912, 1924, 1948, and 1968) has a third-party candidate carried any states, and only in one of them (1912) did that candidate come out in second place nationally or electorally.

Current U.S. third parties

Largest (voter registration over 100,000)
 Libertarian Party – libertarianism, laissez-faire economics, pro-civil liberties, anti-war
 Green Party – Green politics, eco-socialism, anti-capitalism, progressivism, pro-civil liberties, anti-war 
 Constitution Party – Conservatism, paleoconservatism, Christian reconstructionism, social conservatism

Smaller parties by ideology
This section includes only parties that have actually run candidates under their name in recent years.

Right-wing
This section includes any party that advocates positions associated with American conservatism, including both Old Right and New Right ideologies.

 Christian Liberty Party

State-only parties
 American Independent Party (California)
 Conservative Party of New York State
 Constitution Party of Oregon

Centrist
This section includes any party that is independent, populist, or any other that either rejects left–right politics or doesn't have a party platform.
 Alliance Party
 American Solidarity Party
 Citizens Party
 Forward Party/Forward 
 Reform Party of the United States of America
 Serve America Movement
 United States Pirate Party
 Unity Party of America

State-only parties
 Moderate Party of Rhode Island
 Independent Party of Delaware
 Independent Party of Oregon
 Keystone Party of Pennsylvania
 United Utah Party

Left-wing
This section includes any party that has a left-liberal, progressive, social democratic, democratic socialist, or Marxist platform.

 Communist Party USA
 Freedom Socialist Party
 Justice Party USA
 People's Party
 Party for Socialism and Liberation
 Peace and Freedom Party
 Socialist Action
 Socialist Equality Party
 Socialist Alternative
 Socialist Party USA
 Socialist Workers Party
 Working Class Party
 Workers World Party
 Working Families Party

State-only parties
 Charter Party (Cincinnati, Ohio only)
 Green Mountain Peace and Justice Party  (Vermont)
 Green Party of Alaska
 Green Party of Rhode Island
 Labor Party (South Carolina)
 Liberal Party of New York
 Oregon Progressive Party
 Progressive Dane (Dane county, Wisconsin) 
 United Independent Party (Massachusetts)
 Vermont Progressive Party
 Washington Progressive Party

Ethnic nationalism

This section includes parties that primarily advocate for granting special privileges or consideration to members of a certain race, ethnic group, religion etc.
 American Freedom Party
 Black Riders Liberation Party
 National Socialist Movement
 New Afrikan Black Panther Party

Also included in this category are various parties found in and confined to Native American reservations, almost all of which are solely devoted to the furthering of the tribes to which the reservations were assigned. An example of a particularly powerful tribal nationalist party is the Seneca Party that operates on the Seneca Nation of New York's reservations.

Secessionist parties
This section includes parties that primarily advocate for Independence from the United States. (Specific party platforms may range from left wing to right wing).
 Alaskan Independence Party
 Aloha ʻĀina Party (Hawaii)
 California National Party

Single-issue/protest-oriented
This section includes parties that primarily advocate single-issue politics (though they may have a more detailed platform) or may seek to attract protest votes rather than to mount serious political campaigns or advocacy.
 Grassroots—Legalize Cannabis Party 
 Legal Marijuana Now Party
 Prohibition Party
 United States Marijuana Party

State-only parties
 Approval Voting Party (Colorado)
 Natural Law Party (Michigan)
 New York State Right to Life Party
 Rent Is Too Damn High Party (New York)

Notable elections

A number of third party, independent, and write-in candidates have performed well in many U.S. elections.

Greens, Libertarians, and others have elected state legislators and local officials. The Socialist Party elected hundreds of local officials in 169 cities in 33 states by 1912, including Milwaukee, Wisconsin; New Haven, Connecticut; Reading, Pennsylvania; and Schenectady, New York. There have been 20th century governors elected as independents, and from such parties as Progressive, Reform, Farmer-Labor, Populist, and Prohibition. There were others in the 19th century.
However, the United States has had a two-party system for over a century. The winner take all system for presidential elections and the single-seat plurality voting system for Congressional elections have over time created the two-party system (see Duverger's law).

Third-party candidates sometimes win elections. For example, such a candidate has won a U.S. Senate election twice (0.6%) since 1990. Sometimes a national officeholder not affiliated with and endorsed by one of the two major parties is elected. Previously, Senator Lisa Murkowski won re-election in 2010 as a write-in candidate and not as the Republican nominee, and Senator Joe Lieberman ran and won as a third-party candidate in 2006 after leaving the Democratic Party. Currently, there are only three U.S. Senators, Angus King, Bernie Sanders and Kyrsten Sinema, who are neither Democratic nor Republican, while former Representative Justin Amash has joined the Libertarian Party as of April 28, 2020. Although third- party candidates rarely actually win elections, they can have an effect on them. If they do well, then they are often accused of having a spoiler effect. Sometimes, they have won votes in the electoral college, as in the 1832 Presidential election. They can draw attention to issues that may be ignored by the majority parties. If such an issue finds acceptance with the voters, one or more of the major parties may adopt the issue into its own party platform. Also, a third party may be used by the voter to cast a protest vote as a form of referendum on an important issue. Third parties may also help voter turnout by bringing more people to the polls. Third-party candidates at the top of the ticket can help to draw attention to other party candidates down the ballot, helping them to win local or state office. In 2004, the U.S. electorate consisted of an estimated 43% registered Democrats and 33% registered Republicans, with independents and those belonging to other parties constituting 25%.

The only three U.S. Presidents without a major party affiliation were George Washington, John Tyler, and Andrew Johnson, and only Washington served his entire tenure as an independent. Neither of the other two were ever elected president in their own right, both being vice presidents who ascended to office upon the death of the president, and both became independents because they were unpopular with their parties. John Tyler was elected on the Whig ticket in 1840 with William Henry Harrison, but was expelled by his own party. Johnson was the running mate for Abraham Lincoln, who was reelected on the National Union ticket in 1864; it was a temporary name for the Republican Party.

Bill Walker of Alaska was, from 2014 to 2018, the only independent governor in the United States. He was also the first independent governor since Alaska became a state (although not the first third-party governor). In 1998, wrestler Jesse Ventura was elected governor of Minnesota on the Reform Party ticket.

As of 2023, the only independent U.S. senators are Kyrsten Sinema of Arizona, Bernie Sanders of Vermont and Angus King of Maine; these senators caucus with the Democratic Party. No current members of the House of Representatives is a member of a third party. Former representative Justin Amash of Michigan, originally elected as a Republican, joined the Libertarian Party in April 2020 after having left the Republican Party in July 2019, and is the most recent member of a third party in the House. He did not seek re-election in 2020.

Barriers to third party success

Winner-take-all vs. proportional representation
In winner-take-all (or plurality-take-all), the candidate with the largest number of votes wins, even if the margin of victory is extremely narrow or the proportion of votes received is not a majority. Unlike in proportional representation, runners-up do not gain representation in a first-past-the-post system. In the United States, systems of proportional representation are uncommon, especially above the local level and are entirely absent at the national level (even though states like Maine have introduced systems like ranked choice voting, which ensures that the voice of third party voters is heard in case none of the candidates receives a majority of preferences). In Presidential elections, the majority requirement of the Electoral College, and the Constitutional provision for the House of Representatives to decide the election if no candidate receives a majority, serves as a further disincentive to third party candidacies.

In the United States, if an interest group is at odds with its traditional party, it has the option of running sympathetic candidates in primaries. Candidates failing in the primary may form or join a third party. Because of the difficulties third parties face in gaining any representation, third parties tend to exist to promote a specific issue or personality. Often, the intent is to force national public attention on such an issue. Then, one or both of the major parties may rise to commit for or against the matter at hand, or at least weigh in. H. Ross Perot eventually founded a third party, the Reform Party, to support his 1996 campaign. In 1912, Theodore Roosevelt made a spirited run for the presidency on the Progressive Party ticket, but he never made any efforts to help Progressive congressional candidates in 1914, and in the 1916 election, he supported the Republicans.

Ballot access laws
Nationally, ballot access laws are the major challenge to third party candidacies. While the Democratic and Republican parties usually easily obtain ballot access in all fifty states in every election, third parties often fail to meet criteria for ballot access, such as registration fees. Or, in many states, they do not meet petition requirements in which a certain number of voters must sign a petition for a third party or independent candidate to gain ballot access. In recent presidential elections, Ross Perot appeared on all 50 state ballots as an independent in 1992 and the candidate of the Reform Party in 1996.  (Perot, a billionaire, was able to provide significant funds for his campaigns.) Patrick Buchanan appeared on all 50 state ballots in the 2000 election, largely on the basis of Perot's performance as the Reform Party's candidate four years prior. The Libertarian Party has appeared on the ballot in at least 46 states in every election since 1980, except for 1984 when David Bergland gained access in only 36 states. In 1980, 1992, 1996, 2016, and 2020 the party made the ballot in all 50 states and D.C. The Green Party gained access to 44 state ballots in 2000 but only 27 in 2004. The Constitution Party appeared on 42 state ballots in 2004. Ralph Nader, running as an independent in 2004, appeared on 34 state ballots. In 2008, Nader appeared on 45 state ballots and the D.C. ballot. For more information see ballot access laws.

Debate rules
Presidential debates between the nominees of the two major parties first occurred in 1960, then after three cycles without debates, took place again in 1976 and have happened in every election since. Third party or independent candidates have been included in these debates in only two cycles. Ronald Reagan and John Anderson debated in 1980, but incumbent President Carter refused to appear with Anderson, and Anderson was excluded from the subsequent debate between Reagan and Carter.

Debates in other state and federal elections often exclude independent and third-party candidates, and the Supreme Court has upheld such tactics in several cases. The Commission on Presidential Debates (CPD) is a private company.
 Independent Ross Perot was included in all three of the debates with Republican George H. W. Bush and Democrat Bill Clinton in 1992, largely at the behest of the Bush campaign.  His participation helped Perot climb from 7% before the debates to 19% on Election Day.

Perot was excluded from the 1996 debates despite his strong showing four years prior. In 2000, revised debate access rules made it even harder for third-party candidates to gain access by stipulating that, besides being on enough state ballots to win an Electoral College majority, debate participants must clear 15% in pre-debate opinion polls. This rule remained in place for 2004, when as many as 62 million people watched the debates, and has continued being in effect as of 2008. The 15% criterion, had it been in place, would have prevented Anderson and Perot from participating in the debates they appeared in.

Major party marginalization

A third-party candidate will sometimes strike a chord with a section of voters in a particular election, bringing an issue to national prominence and amount a significant proportion of the popular vote. Major parties often respond to this by adopting this issue in a subsequent election. After 1968, under President Nixon the Republican Party adopted a "Southern Strategy" to win the support of conservative Democrats opposed to the Civil Rights Movement and resulting legislation and to combat third parties with southern agendas. This can be seen as a response to the popularity of segregationist candidate George Wallace who gained 13.5% of the popular vote in the 1968 election for the American Independent Party.

In 1996, both the Democrats and the Republicans agreed to deficit reduction on the back of Ross Perot's popularity in the 1992 election. This severely undermined Perot's campaign in the 1996 election.

See also
Equal-time rule
Third-party and independent members of the United States House of Representatives
United States Electoral College
Independent politician
Political party
Political parties in the United States
Proportional representation
Third party (politics)
Suffrage

References

Further reading

Surveys
 Epstein, David A. (2012). Left, Right, Out: The History of Third Parties in America. Arts and Letters Imperium Publications. 
 Gillespie, J. David. Challengers to Duopoly: Why Third Parties Matter in American Two-Party Politics (University of South Carolina Press, 2012)
 Green, Donald J. Third-Party Matters: Politics, Presidents, and Third Parties in American History (Praeger, 2010)
 Herrnson, Paul S. and John C. Green, eds. Multiparty Politics in America (Rowman & Littlefield, 1997)
 Hesseltine, William B. Third-Party Movements in the United States (1962), Brief survey
 Hicks, John D. "The Third Party Tradition in American Politics." Mississippi Valley Historical Review 20 (1933): 3–28. in JSTOR
 Kruschke, Earl R. Encyclopedia of Third Parties in the United States (ABC-CLIO, 1991)
 Ness, Immanuel and James Ciment, eds. Encyclopedia of Third Parties in America (4 vol. 2006)
 Richardson, Darcy G. Others: Third Party Politics from the Nation's Founding to the Rise and Fall of the Greenback-Labor Party. Vol. 1. iUniverse, 2004.
 Rosenstone, Steven J., Roy L. Behr, and Edward H. Lazarus. Third Parties in America: Citizen Response to Major Party Failure (2nd ed. Princeton University Press, 1996)
 Schlesinger, Arthur Meier, Jr. ed. History of U.S. Political Parties (1973) multivolume compilation includes essays by experts on the more important third parties, plus some primary sources
  Sifry, Micah L. Spoiling for a Fight: Third Party Politics in America (Routledge, 2002)

Scholarly studies
 Abramson Paul R., John H. Aldrich, Phil Paolino, and David W. Rohde. "Third-Party and Independent Candidates in American Politics: Wallace, Anderson, and Perot." Political Science Quarterly 110 (1995): 349–67
 Argersinger, Peter H. The Limits of Agrarian Radicalism: Western Populism and American Politics (University Press of Kansas, 1995)
 Berg, John C. "Beyond a Third Party: The Other Minor Parties in the 1996 Elections," in The State of the Parties: The Changing Role of Contemporary American Parties ed by Daniel M. Shea and John C. Green (3rd ed. Rowman & Littlefield, 1998), pp. 212–28
 Berg, John C. "Spoiler or Builder? The Effect of Ralph Nader's 2000 Campaign on the U.S. Greens." in The State of the Parties: The Changing Role of Contemporary American Parties, (4th ed. 2003) edited by John C. Green and Rick Farmer, pp. 323–36.
 Brooks, Corey M. Liberty Power: Antislavery Third Parties and the Transformation of American Politics (University of Chicago Press, 2016). 302 pp.
 Burden, Barry C. "Ralph Nader's Campaign Strategy in the 2000 U.S. Presidential Election." American Politics Research 33 (2005): 672–99.
 Carlin, Diana B., and Mitchell S. McKinney, eds. The 1992 Presidential Debates in Focus (1994), includes Ross Parot
 Chace, James. 1912: Wilson, Roosevelt, Taft and Debs – The Election that Changed the Country (2009)
 Darsey, James. "The Legend of Eugene Debs: Prophetic Ethos as Radical Argument." Quarterly Journal of Speech 74 (1988): 434–52.
 Gould, Lewis L. Four Hats in the Ring: The 1912 Election and the Birth of Modern American Politics (2008)
 Hazlett, Joseph. The Libertarian Party and Other Minor Political Parties in the United States (McFarland & Company, 1992)
 Hogan, J. Michael. "Wallace and the Wallacites: A Reexamination." Southern Speech Communication Journal 50 (1984): 24–48. On George Wallace in 1968
 Jelen, Ted G. ed.  Ross for Boss: The Perot Phenomenon and Beyond (State University of New York Press, 2001)
 Koch, Jeffrey. "The Perot Candidacy and Attitudes Toward Government and Politics." Political Research Quarterly 51 (1998): 141–53.
 Koch, Jeffrey. "Political Cynicism and Third Party Support in American Presidential Elections," American Politics Research 31 (2003): 48–65.
 Lee, Michael J. "The Populist Chameleon: The People's Party, Huey Long, George Wallace, and the Populist Argumentative Frame." Quarterly Journal of Speech (2006): 355–78.
 Mowry, George E. Theodore Roosevelt and the Progressive Movement (1946), on 1912
 Rapoport, Ronald B., and Walter J. Stone. Three's a Crowd: The Dynamic of Third Parties, Ross Perot, and Republican Resurgence (University of Michigan Press, 2005)
 Richardson, Darcy G. Others: Third Parties During the Populist Period (2007) 506 pp
 Richardson, Darcy G.  A Toast to Glory: The Prohibition Party Flirts With Greatness  59 pp
 Rohler, Lloyd. "Conservative Appeals to the People: George Wallace's Populist Rhetoric." Southern Communication Journal 64 (1999): 316–22.
 Rohler, Lloyd. George Wallace: Conservative Populist (Praeger, 2004)
 Rosenfeld, Lawrence W. "George Wallace Plays Rosemary's Baby." Quarterly Journal of Speech 55 (1969): 36–44.
 Ross, Jack. The Socialist Party of America: A Complete History (2015) 824 pp
 Shepard, Ryan Michael. "Deeds done in different words: a genre-based approach to third party presidential campaign discourse." (PhD Dissertation, University of Kansas 2011) online
Tamas, Bernard. 2018. The Demise and Rebirth of American Third Parties: Poised for Political Revival? Routledge.

External links
 The Importance of Ballot Access, essay by Richard Winger
 Ballot Access News – Ballot Access news on all parties
 Free and Equal – Election Reform to end partisan duopoly
 Independent Political Report – Frequently updated source for third party news

 
Political opposition
Political parties in the United States